Berry Down Cross is a village in Devon, England. The village has two Bronze Age round barrows located within it and both are listed as scheduled monuments by Historic England.

Junction 
Berry Down Cross is infamous for its A3123 road junction, which gained a reputation for being unsafe. In 2020, the Department for Transport announced a £2.2 million scheme to improve the safety of the road including a  speed limit and cat's eyes.

References 

Villages in Devon